The 1961 Calgary Stampeders finished in 3rd place in the Western Conference of the Canadian Football League (CFL) with a 7–9 record. They were defeated in the Western Finals by the Winnipeg Blue Bombers.

Regular season

Season standings

Season schedule

Playoffs

Cenference Semi-Finals

 Calgary won the total-point series by 27–26. The Stampeders will play the Winnipeg Blue Bombers in the Western Finals.

Conference finals

 ''Winnipeg wins the best of three series 2–0. The Blue Bombers will advance to the Grey Cup Championship game.

Awards and records
 CFL's Most Outstanding Canadian Award – Tony Pajaczkowski (DE)

References

Calgary Stampeders seasons
1961 Canadian Football League season by team
Calgary Stampeders